poire_z (pronounced "pwar-zed") was an electronic free improvisation music group formed in 1998. Its members all have long careers in improvised music; critic Fred Grand of Avant calls poire_z a "post-AMM supergroup."

Band history
At a music festival at Nantes, France in 1998, percussionist Gunter Muller and turntablist Erikm were scheduled to perform as a duo. The same festival featured a performance by duo Voice Crack. The four musicians made an unscheduled collaboration, and afterwards formed a semi-regular quartet.

They recorded several albums and made a number of live appearances before disbanding. poire_z often invited a fifth musician as a guest: Keith Rowe, Phil Minton, Christian Marclay, Otomo Yoshihide, Sachiko M and others performed or recorded with the core quartet.

As with much free improvisation, poire_z's music is generally focused more on a group sound, and given the musicians' unorthodox approach to their instruments, it is often difficult to discern who is generating any individual sound. Aside from glimpses of Muller's occasionally unprocessed percussion, their music is nearly all electronic blips, clicks and droning like a shortwave radio tuned in to an extraterrestrial broadcast; critic Ed Howard described the group's music as "all whir and purr and throb, the soldered electronic exclamations of the Voice Crack duo spurting around the steady rhythmic drive of Muller and eRikm ... a dense cycling drone with harsh electronic interjections skipping over the top." One piece is described as "delicate tones, crackles and light bubbling sounds, resting and intermingling with characteristic weightlessness, only occasionally being interrupted by glimpses of harsher textures."

Voice Crack formally disbanded in about 2004, and poire_z have not recorded or performed since.

Personnel
Erikm: 3K-PAD∞System
Gunter Muller: percussion, effects
Andy Guhl and Norbert Möslang (who recorded as Voice Crack) on homemade electronics.

Discography

 1999 : Poire_Z - For4ears records
 2001 : Presque_Chic - Sonoris
 2002 : + - with Otomo Yoshihide • Sachiko M • Christian Marclay - Erstwhile Records
 2004 : Q - Poire Z's last performance, with guest vocalist Phil Minton
 Sampler
 2000 : mottomo otomo - Trost Records
 2000 : Hairles_handle - The Wire tapper 6
 2002 : fb50" - fals.ch
 2004 : The Wire Tapper 11  Poire_z + phil Minton - The Wire tapper 11
 2008 : A SHORT HISTORY 2000-2005- Contemporary Art And Sound . Dolmen

 Post-Poire_Z
 Since 2004 Günter Müller & Norbert Moslang have also collaborated in trio or quartet.
 2002 : Buda Rom Voice Crack & Günter Müller - For4ears
 2003 : Oystered Voice Crack & Günter Müller & Oren Ambarchi - Audiosphere sub Rosa
 2011 : Stodgy Erikm & Norbert Möslang - Mikroton Recordings
 2016 : Pavillon du Lac with  Günter Müller + Norbert Möslang +  Erikm - Dolmen
 Sampler
 2011 : Mikroton eRikm / Norbert Möslang -  Mikroton
 2011 : Below The Radar eRikm / Norbert Möslang - The Wire
 2005 : t-u-b-e / gebeugt 2005'' Norbert Möslang / eRikm - Wergo

 Pre-Poire_Z
 1982 : Knack On - Norbert Möslang & Andy Guhl
 1990 : Voice Crack – "Earflash" - V-Records, Uhlang Produktion
 1996 : Table Chair and Hatstand - Voice Crack + Günter Müller +  Jim O’Rourke - Uhlang Production

References

DIY culture
Free improvisation ensembles
Electronics and society
Experimental musical groups
French electronic music groups
Articles with underscores in the title
German electronic music groups